The Morgan State Bears football team competes in American football on behalf of Morgan State University. The Bears compete in the NCAA Division I Football Championship Subdivision, currently as a member of the Mid-Eastern Athletic Conference (MEAC). The Bears play their home games at Hughes Stadium, a 10,000 seat facility in Baltimore, Maryland.

Morgan State began playing football in 1898, 31 years after the school was founded.  The team's all-time record is 405 wins, 379 losses and 38 ties. 173 of those wins came between 1929 and 1959 when Edward P. Hurt was the head coach and the Bears won 14 Central Intercollegiate Athletic Association (CIAA) championships. Earl Banks won four CIAA championships during the 1960s and an additional championship in 1971 after Morgan entered the MEAC. The Bears have won three MEAC Championships (1976, 1979 and 2014).

History

Classifications
1956–1972: NCAA College Division
1973–1977: NCAA Division II
1978-present: NCAA Division I–AA/FCS

Conference memberships
 1899–1928: Independent
 1929–1970: Central Intercollegiate Athletic Association
 1971–1979: Mid-Eastern Athletic Conference
 1979–present: Mid-Eastern Athletic Conference

Historic first
1976, Morgan State played Grambling State in the first American college football game in Asia.  Morgan State lost 42–16 in Tokyo, Japan.

Championships

Rivals
Morgan State and Howard participate in the Howard–Morgan State football rivalry.  

Towson University and Morgan State share a rivalry called The Battle for Greater Baltimore.

Playoff appearances

NCAA Division I-AA/FCS
The Bears have made one appearance in the Division I-AA/FCS playoffs, with a combined record of 0-1.

NCAA Division II
The Bears made one appearance in the Division II playoffs, with a combined record of 0-1.

Coaches

Eddie Hurt era
Coach Eddie P. Hurt took over the Morgan Bears football team in 1929, the next year his teams won the first of the 14 CIAA championships they would win with him at the helm. More importantly, Hurt, and his assistant coach Talmadge L. Hill, built a program that allowed black athletes to show case their talents where such a venue had been non-existent before. From 1931 to 1938, Hurt coached the Bears to a 54-game win streak without a single loss. During his tenure, Morgan's football teams completed 11 seasons undefeated and, in the 1943 season, opponents failed to score a single point against the Bears. Hurt is a member of the HBCU coaches Hall of Fame  and in 1952 Morgan named its new $1 million gymnasium facility after him.

Earl "Papa Bear" Banks era
Earl Banks succeeded Hurt and took Morgan football to the next level. Banks was the Head coach from 1960 to 1973.  He coached the Bears to a 31-game winning streak, three unbeaten regular seasons, four CIAA titles, a MEAC championship, and four bowl games. Twice during his tenure, Morgan led the nation in total defense.  35 of Bank's players went on to play in the NFL, including Pro Football Hall of Famers Leroy Kelly and Willie Lanier; two more players played professional ball in the CFL. Banks was inducted into five sports Halls of Fame including the College Football Hall of Fame in 1992.

Modern era
Two Coaches have had winning records at Morgan since the departure of Banks at the end of the 1973 season. The Bears had suffered 23 straight seasons with a losing record until the arrival of former Coach Donald Hill-Eley whose first team had a 7–5 record in the 2002 season. Lee Hull was named head coach on January 8, 2014 and his first team went 7–5 and won a share of the MEAC championship and also played in the NCAA FCS Playoffs.

Notable alumni
Fifty three former Morgan players have gone on to play professional football. Thirty nine players went to the NFL, eight to the CFL, three to the WFL and one each to the AAFC, the Arena Football League and the AIFA. At least one player has gone to the NFL every decade since 1950 from Morgan State.

Former Morgan Bears Len Ford, Leroy Kelly, Willie Lanier and Rosey Brown are members of the Pro Football Hall of Fame in Canton, Ohio.

See also
List of black college football classics

References

External links
 Official website

 
American football teams established in 1898
1898 establishments in Maryland